The Rhodospirillales are an order of Pseudomonadota.

Notable Families 
The Acetobacteraceae comprise the acetic acid bacteria, which are heterotrophic and produce acetic acid during their respiration.

The Rhodospirillaceae include mainly purple nonsulfur bacteria, which produce energy through photosynthesis.

Phylogeny 
The currently accepted taxonomy is based on the List of Prokaryotic names with Standing in Nomenclature (LPSN). The phylogeny is based on whole-genome analysis.

Notes

References 

 
Bacteria orders